Chaams (born 30 November 1972) is an Indian actor and comedian who has appeared in Tamil language films. His birth name is Swaminathan. He has predominantly appeared in supporting roles, notably in Crazy Mohan dramas and playing one of the several leads in Palaivana Solai (2009) and Onbadhule Guru (2013).

Career

He is an actor who began his career by doing small roles but later bagged meaningful roles and had received mass appreciation for his performances.  Right from the beginning he started a new style of comedy that people loved and then he followed it with every film. He used his natural tone and local Tamilian style to deliver dialogues with perfect timing and incredible sense of humor.

In the year 2009,  a film named Palaivana Solai was released which was a remake version of the same film released in 1981 where a love story of five friends woven around one simple girl received critics appreciation. In the 2009 flick, Chaams had played the lead role as one of the five friends. This position gave him maximum satisfaction till date.

Chaams garnered acclaim for his role in Payanam (2011). Rediff stated that a "special mention must be made of Chaams" as he provided "excellent comic relief". The Hindu stated that "Chaams as the doting fan whose blinkers fall off" is "a riot".

Similarly in the year 2013, another film Onbadhule Guru was released, where he played the role of disgruntled married man who wants to go back to his bachelor days along with his other friends. The film needed all leading actors to do comedy as per the script and actor Chaams appeared as Guru, which was marvelous.

He has appeared in some Tamil films in 2015, and most of the films have been received well by audiences. His expression only can one make laugh and he has excelled in films like, Maanga and 49-O respectively. Earlier, he was acting with comedians like Vadivelu and Goundamani and supported in their comedy roles.

In 2021, Chaams shines in a serious role and is very impressive with the film Operation JuJuPi as lead role.

Filmography

Television

References

External links 

 

Indian male film actors
Tamil male actors
Male actors in Tamil cinema
Tamil comedians
Living people
1970 births